Irish car bomb may refer to:

 Car bombs on the island of Ireland, including:
 Proxy bombs
Bombings in Northern Ireland:
 1998 Banbridge bombing
 Benny's Bar bombing
 Bloody Friday (1972)
 Claudy bombing
 Attack on Cloghoge checkpoint
 1973 Coleraine bombings
 1970 Crossmaglen bombing
 Donegall Street bombing
 Forensic Science Laboratory bombing
 Glenanne barracks bombing
 Hillcrest Bar bombing
 Murder of Ronan Kerr
 Lisburn van bombing
 2010 Newry car bombing
 Omagh bombing
 Battle at Springmartin
 Thiepval barracks bombing
 Warrenpoint ambush
In the Republic of Ireland:
 Belturbet bombing
 Castleblayney bombing
 Donnelly's Bar and Kay's Tavern attacks
 Dublin and Monaghan bombings
 1972 and 1973 Dublin bombings
Irish car bomb (cocktail), a drink made with Irish cream, Irish whiskey and Irish stout